Ilia Calderón Chamat (born 1972) is a Colombian journalist. Born in Chocó, Calderón currently works as the news anchor for Univision's national evening newscast along with Jorge Ramos. She is also the presenter of the Univision weekly newsmagazine Aquí y Ahora.

Education and early career 

She majored in Social Work at Universidad de Antioquia. She presented several news shows, first on regional channel Teleantioquia. In 1998 she went to national television for Noticiero CM&. Three years later, she went to Telemundo, where she hosted the Noticiero Telemundo weekend edition and a segment at the now defunct morning show Cada Día con María Antonieta.

In 2005 she underwent a successful operation to remove a tumour in her uterus.

In March 2007, she left Telemundo to host Univision Primer Impacto's weekend edition. In 2009 Primer Impacto's host Fernando del Rincon was fired and Ilia became a regular co-host on the Monday-Friday edition with Barbara Bermudo leaving the weekend edition to Satcha Pretto.

In 2010, while still co-anchoring Primer Impacto she became the co-anchor of week day edition Univision's late evening newscast "Noticiero Univision Edición Nocturna" airing at 11:30pm.

On June 3, 2011, it was announced that Pamela Silva would be joining Primer Impacto, replacing Ilia Calderón who will stay on "Noticiero Univision Edición Nocturna".

She won an Emmy Award for her 2017 interview of Christopher Barker, the Ku Klux Klan imperial wizard. In December 2017, she made history when she replaced former co-anchor Maria Elena Salinas on Noticiero Univision. This made her the first Afro-Latina to anchor a weekday primetime newscast for a major broadcast network in the United States.

On March 15, 2020, she co-hosted the eleventh Democratic Presidential Debate on CNN with Jake Tapper and Dana Bash.

Personal life

She is married to Eugene Jang; they have one daughter named Anna Jang-Calderon.

References

External links
 Ilia Calderón at Colarte

Colombian television journalists
Colombian women journalists
Colombian television presenters
Colombian women television presenters
Colombian women television journalists
1972 births
Living people
University of Antioquia people
People from Chocó Department
American people of Colombian descent